"Love Bites" is a 1996 song by Grace Jones.

Background
"Love Bites" is an uptempo dance track. Jones sings the song from the perspective of a vampire, perhaps alluding to the theme of her 1986 feature film Vamp. The song was released as a non-label promo-only single to promote the Sci-Fi Channel's Vampire Week, which consisted of a series of vampire-themed films aired on the channel in early November 1996. As the song was released for a promotional use only, and was not commercially available, it did not chart, and has not been since included on any Grace Jones hits compilations.

Music video
A music video was supposedly filmed, but has yet to surface. It sees Jones wearing a blonde wig, and then changing wigs and costumes a number of times.

Track listing
CD promotional single
 "Love Bites" (7" Fright Night Mix) – 3:40
 "Love Bites" (12" Dark Night Mix) – 7:35
 "Love Bites" (12" Fright Night Mix) – 8:21
 "Love Bites" (12" Deep Into the Night Mix) – 6:40
 "Love Bites" (7" Fright Night Instrumental) – 3:52
 "Love Bites" (7" Deep Into the Night Mix) – 3:45

12" promotional single
A1. "Love Bites" (12" Fright Night Mix) – 8:21
A2. "Love Bites" (7" Fright Night Mix) – 3:40
B1. "Love Bites" (12" Dark Night Mix) – 7:35
B2. "Love Bites" (12" Deep Into the Night Mix) – 6:40

References

1996 singles
Grace Jones songs
House music songs
1996 songs
Song articles with missing songwriters